Thung Song Hong Station is a railway station in Lak Si District, Bangkok. It serves the SRT Dark Red Line.

History 
Thung Song Hong was initially a railway halt on the Northern Line and Northeastern Line of the State Railway of Thailand serving commuter trains. A new elevated station was constructed and opened on 2 August 2021 following the opening of the SRT Dark Red Line. Thung Song Hong Halt closed on 19 January 2023 after all services started operating on the elevated tracks.

References 

Railway stations in Thailand
Railway stations in Bangkok